The following is a list of the 463 communes of the Charente-Maritime department of France.

The communes cooperate in the following intercommunalities (as of 2020):
Communauté d'agglomération Rochefort Océan
Communauté d'agglomération de La Rochelle
Communauté d'agglomération Royan Atlantique
Communauté d'agglomération de Saintes
Communauté de communes Aunis Atlantique
Communauté de communes Aunis Sud
Communauté de communes du Bassin de Marennes
Communauté de communes Cœur de Saintonge
Communauté de communes de Gémozac et de la Saintonge Viticole
Communauté de communes de la Haute-Saintonge
Communauté de communes de l'Île-de-Ré
Communauté de communes de l'Île-d'Oléron
Communauté de communes des Vals de Saintonge

References

Lists of communes of France